The 2014/15 NTFL season was the 94th season of the Northern Territory Football League (NTFL).

The Wanderers Eagles have won there 12th premiership title while defeating St Marys in the grand final by 34 points.

Ladder

Grand Final

References

Northern Territory Football League seasons
NTFL